The Sunuwar or Koinch (Sunuwār Jāti) is a Kirati tribe native to Nepal, parts of India (West Bengal and Sikkim) and southern Bhutan. They speak the Sunuwar language. According to the 2001 census of Nepal, 17% of the tribe follow the Kirant religion and adopt the Mundhum (Kiranti) culture.

The Kõinch’s (Sunuwar) number 55,752. The term ‘Kõinchs’ is also the name of the mother tongue. Other terms like Mukhiya or Mukhia are exonyms of the tribe. Sunuwar have their distinct language, religion, culture and social customs.
They inhabit the eastern hills of Nepal and Himalayan. They are concentrated along the Molung Khola, Likhu Khola and Khimti Khola (‘Khola’ Indo-Aryan Nepali etymon ‘rivulet’) regions. By administrative division, they dwell in Okhaldhunga, Ramechhap and Dolakha districts of Nepal, politically known as Wallo kirat (‘Near/Hither’), Kirant (in the past and also in use among the Kirantis at present) after the fall of the Kirant dynasty (ruling for about 1903 years and 8 months) at the ancient Nepal valley. Wallo Kirant in the past was their Kipat or communal land.

Lifestyle 
Most Sunuwar practice agriculture (approximately 55%). They do so throughout the eastern hills of present-day Nepal. Crop cultivation and cattle farming (rice, millet, wheat, soybean, potato, and maize) are the main agricultural works. Sunuwar people also took part in the Second World War and were known as Gorkhali fighters, as well as honest. Some Sunuwar still join the Nepal Army, Indian Army, Singapore Police Force and British Army.

Traditional cultures 

Sunuwar are very rich in culture and traditions. They have hundreds of traditional feasts and festivals with complex rituals and rules. Every traditional feast or festival has its own objectives, characteristics, and system of celebration. Some festivals, such as Chandi Dance in Baisakh Purnima, Sakela (Shyadar-Pidar), Gil puja (Gil-Pidar), and Meserani puja (Meserani-Pidar), are considered more important than others. They celebrate the Shyadar-pidar festival on the Day of Buddha Purnima, or after 5 days of Buddha Purnima(Panchami) according to the Nepali calendar. Sunuwar New year is celebrated on the day of Basanta Panchami. As a community, they celebrate Meserani Pidar twice a year, based on the Lunar Calendar.

Sunuwar Song (Koich Kumsho) 
Sunuwari Song:
Reuhita Ragimshumshaa(Raining)

Kirant Kings 
The 29 Kirat kings were as follows:
Yalamber  
Pavi 
Skandhar 
Balamba 
Hriti 
Humati 
Jitedasti 
Galinja 
Pushka 
Suyarma 
Papa 
Bunka 
Swananda 
Sthunko 
Jinghri 
Nane 
Luka 
Thor 
Thoko 
Verma 
Guja 
Pushkar 
Keshu 
Suja 
Sansa 
Gunam 
Khimbu 
Patuka 
Gasti

Gallery

See also 

 Phalate or Falate
 Khijee or Khiji
 Bhujee 
 Prette or Priti
 Ragani

References

Indigenous peoples of Nepal
Social groups of West Bengal
Ethnic groups in Northeast India
Sikkim